"This Time" is a song recorded by Canadian country music artist Patricia Conroy. It was released in 1990 as the first single from her debut album, Blue Angel. It peaked at number 10 on the RPM Country Tracks chart in December 1990.

Chart performance

References

1990 songs
1990 singles
Patricia Conroy songs
Warner Music Group singles